The Estes-Williams American Legion Hut #61 is a historic clubhouse on AR 62/412 in Yellville, Arkansas.  It is a single-story Rustic-style log building built in 1933-34 by the local chapter of the American Legion, with funding assistance from the Civil Works Administration.  The building is roughly T-shaped, with small projecting sections at the front and rear.  It has a cross-gable roof with extended eaves and exposed rafter tails supported by large knee braces in the Craftsman style.  The building is also used by other veterans' and community groups for meetings and events.

The building was listed on the National Register of Historic Places in 2001.

See also
National Register of Historic Places listings in Marion County, Arkansas

References

American Legion buildings
Cultural infrastructure completed in 1933
Clubhouses on the National Register of Historic Places in Arkansas
National Register of Historic Places in Marion County, Arkansas
Civil Works Administration
1933 establishments in Arkansas
Rustic architecture in Arkansas
American Craftsman architecture in Arkansas
Yellville, Arkansas